Perseus was a vacuum tube (valve) computer built by Ferranti Ltd of Great Britain. It was a development of the Ferranti Pegasus computer for large-scale  data processing. Perseus, which was one of Ferranti's computer systems that included Orion and Sirius, was the company's first production machine marketed towards commercial users. The system used the automatic checking method. Two were sold, both to overseas insurance companies in 1959.

Design
Perseus has two components that functioned independently of each other. The first was the central computer – the processing unit that handled data processing and commercial work. The second was the unit for printing from half-inch magnetic tape. The design aim of Perseus was to enable large-scale data-processing, rather than scientific computing. It used the same electronic technology as the Ferranti Pegasus, similarly engineered. The envisaged applications would involve vast amounts of file data, for which 1/2" magnetic tape was provided. The word length was 72 bits, with 160 words of random-access memory provided by single-word nickel acoustic delay lines. Unlike Pegasus with its magnetic drum, further internal store was provided by 864, 16-word delay lines. Large-scale data input was provided by punched card readers available for both round- and rectangular-hole cards. Data output was via magnetic tape to an off-line unit equipped with 300 lines per minute Samastronic line printers.

References

Bibliography

Vacuum tube computers
1950s computers
Perseus
Early British computers